Hampton Roads Port of Embarkation was the Army command structure and distributed port infrastructure in the Hampton Roads area of Virginia supporting movement of personnel and cargo overseas. It had been activated as the Newport News Port of Embarkation in World War I, deactivated, then reactivated 15 June 1942.

Port of Embarkation concept

An Army POE was a command structure and interconnected land transportation, supply and troop housing complex devoted to efficiently loading overseas transports. The scope of the World War II POE is summarized in Army Regulations: AR 55-75, par. 2B, 1 June 1944:

"The commanding officer of a port of embarkation will be responsible for and will have authority over all activities at the port, the reception, supply, transportation, embarkation, and debarkation of troops, and the receipt, storage, and transportation of supplies. He will see that the ships furnished him are properly fitted out for the purpose for which they are intended; he will supervise the operation and maintenance of military traffic between his port and the oversea base or bases; he will command all troops assigned to the port and its component parts, including troops being staged, and will be responsible for the efficient and economical direction of their operations. He will be responsible for the furnishing of necessary instructions to individuals and organizations embarked or debarked at the port . . . He will be responsible for taking the necessary measures to insure the smooth and orderly flow of troops and supplies through the port." (AR 55-75, par. 2B, 1 Jun 44. Quoted Chester Wardlow : pages 95—96, The Transportation Corps: Responsibilities, Organization, and Operations)

Any primary POE could have sub ports and cargo ports even in other cities or temporarily assigned for movements between the United States to one of the overseas commands it normally served.

For troop movements the most critical timing factor was availability of the transports and sailing dates so that the most effective means of minimizing delays at the port was for the POE to control the movement of troops from their home stations to the port as well as having responsibility for ensuring troops were properly equipped and prepared for overseas deployment. Most troops were embarked destined for arrival at rear area assembly points, but when destined for landing against hostile forces the ports "combat loaded" troops under different procedures made in consultation with the force commander that included billeting combat teams together at the port and loading team equipment and supplies aboard the assault vessels for efficient unloading.

In one respect the POE Command extended even to the troops and cargo embarked on ships until they were disembarked overseas through "transport commanders" and "cargo security officers" aboard all troop and cargo ships under Army control, either owned, bareboat chartered and operated or charter with operation by WSA agents that were appointed and under the command of the POE. Troops embarked aboard all vessels except U.S. Naval transports remained under overall command of the port commander until disembarked overseas. That command was exercised by the Transport Commander whose responsibilities extended to all passengers and cargo but did not extend to operation of the ship which remained with the ship's master. On large troop ships the transport command included a permanent staff of administration, commissary, medical and chaplain personnel. The cargo security officers were representatives of the port commander aboard ships only transporting Army cargo.

World War I
Two ports of embarkation were established with commanders appointed 17 July 1917, one at New York with headquarters at Hoboken and the second, then officially the Newport News Port of Embarkation, in Hampton Roads with headquarters at Newport News. While 88% of troops, 1,656,000 from New York itself and 142,000 from its sub-ports, sent overseas transited through the New York Port of Embarkation, 288,000 transited through the Newport News Port of Embarkation.

World War II reactivation

Hampton Roads Port of Embarkation (HRPOE or HRPE) was the third largest United States Army Transportation Corps port of embarkation in terms of passengers and second in terms of cargo tonnage on the East Coast of the United States during World War II. Until June 1942 Hampton Roads was a sub-port of the New York Port of Embarkation.

Hampton Roads Port of Embarkation, administratively based in Newport News, Virginia, included the exclusively cargo sub port of Baltimore. The port, along with its Baltimore cargo port and the Philadelphia cargo port that was a sub port of the New York Port of Embarkation (NYPOE), was mainly focused on shipments to the Mediterranean and European areas. Troops were temporarily quartered in embarkation camps where the port was responsible for ensuring final outfitting before embarkation with HRPOE's Camp Patrick Henry being capable of housing 24,100 troops.

Shortly after its activation 15 June 1942 the port was responsible for combat loading the Western Task Force of the North African invasion assault convoy. All of the combat loaded ships from the United States bound for North Africa, except  with the 39th Combat Team embarked at the NYPOE, were loaded at the HRPOE. The port was again called on to combat load the reinforced 45th Infantry Division for Sicily. HRPOE had developed an efficient plan in which combat loaded ships were loaded in two "flights" whereby the first group would practice debarkation in the Chesapeake while the second group loaded and the second group would practice as the first refueled and topped off supplies.

During the period of its operation as of August 1945 its passenger total was 725,880 and cargo tonnage was 12,521,868 and its subsidiary Baltimore cargo port accounted for 6,504,028 tons.

Footnotes

See also
New York Port of Embarkation

References

References cited

Further reading
The Road to Victory, A History of Hampton Roads Port of Embarkation in World War II, William Reginald Wheeler, Yale University Press, 1946 in 2 volumes LCCN: 46020398

External links
Historical Marker Database, photo "Headquarters, Hampton Roads Port of Embarkation, U. S. Army"
Library of Virginia: United States Army Signal Corps Photograph Collection, Hampton Roads Embarkation Series, 1942- 1946
The Mariners' Museum: Gallery, Hampton Roads Port of Embarkation
Virginia War Museum: Hampton Roads Port of Embarkation

Transportation units and formations of the United States Army
Military units and formations of the United States Army in World War II
Military installations in Virginia
History of Newport News, Virginia